Chicken katsu curry may refer to:

 Katsu curry
 Japanese curry
 Chicken katsu

Curry
Chicken as food
Japanese rice dishes
Curry dishes